Satomi Oka (Born September 15, 1935, in Takarazuka-Shi, Hyōgo Prefecture, Japan) is a Japanese actress. She has made over 150 films in her career, including such classics as Miyamoto Musashi and Akō Rōshi.

While attending Amagasaki High School in Amagasaki, Japan, she was selected as Miss Cinderella in 1953 for a “Japan Cinderella Princess Contest” held by RKO Radio & Film Company in conjunction with Mainichi Shinbun. Crowned as Miss Cinderella, Oka was invited to visit Hollywood and Disney Studios from March 20 to April 4, 1953. During her two-week visit, Oka was invited to visit and dine with actors such as Ann Blyth and Cary Grant.
A full article of this trip was featured in the July issue of Eiga No Tomo magazine in 1953. As this trip took place prior to the liberalization of foreign travel, it was then considered to be a valuable trip to Hollywood.

After high school, Oka worked as an office secretary at RKO Radio & Film Company before being scouted by Toei Studios in 1955. Debuting the same year in Shinsengumi’s The Black Hooded Seer, she quickly gained popularity and was referred to as Toei's "Princess" from the many roles she played as a heroine.

Selected filmography 
 Dai-bosatsu tōge (1957)
 Naked Sun (1958)
 Akō Rōshi (赤穂浪士 Akō Rōshi) (1961)
 Bushido, Samurai Saga (1963)

External links 
 

Japanese film actresses
1935 births
Living people